Coleophora pseudodirectella is a moth of the family Coleophoridae. It is found only in Poland.

References

pseudodirectella
Moths described in 1959
Endemic fauna of Poland
Moths of Europe